The second season of the animated television series, The Boondocks originally aired in the United States on Cartoon Network's late night programming block, Adult Swim. The second season features 15 episode, it originally premiered on October 8, 2007 with "...Or Die Trying" and ended with "The Story of Gangstalicious 2" on February 4, 2008. 

"The Hunger Strike" and "The Uncle Ruckus Reality Show" did not initially air in the United States, due to legal reasons. These episodes aired in Canada and Latin America; and were also released in the United States on DVD and iTunes. Adult Swim eventually aired both episodes in the United States, 12 years after the original broadcast of the season and 6 years after the ending of the series, on May 29, 2020.

All fifteen episodes from season two were released completely uncensored on a three-disc DVD set in the United States on June 10, 2008. The second season is also available on iTunes and has been made available for on demand streaming on Netflix.

Production
Seung Eun Kim and Dan Fausett served as directors, and series creator Aaron McGruder, Rodney Barnes, Jason Van Veen, and Yamara Taylor served as writers for season two. All episodes in season two, with the exception of "The Hunger Strike" and "The Uncle Ruckus Reality Show", originally aired in the United States on Cartoon Network's late night programming block, Adult Swim, and are rated TV-MA-V for graphic violence and dangerous activity involving children, explicit language (mostly heavy use of racist, sexist, and homophobic slurs, as well as bleeped-out profanity), and infrequent instances of strong sexual content.

Season two features guest appearances from Snoop Dogg, Mo'Nique, Katt Williams, Charlie Murphy, Samuel L. Jackson, Mos Def, Marion Ross, Bill Duke, Ghostface Killah, Terry Crews, Kevin Michael Richardson, Busta Rhymes, Fatman Scoop, Sway Calloway, Xzibit, Nate Dogg, Aisha Tyler, Tichina Arnold, Cedric the Entertainer, Lil Wayne, Cee-Lo Green, Fred Willard, Tavis Smiley, and Donald Faison.

Episodes

Home release
All fifteen episodes from season two, including the episodes unaired in America: "The Hunger Strike" and "The Uncle Ruckus Reality Show",  were released completely uncensored on a three-disc DVD set in the United States on June 10, 2008.

In addition all episodes from season two are available on iTunes.

References

The Boondocks (TV series) seasons
2007 American television seasons
2008 American television seasons